Basire is a surname. Notable people with the surname include:

Claude Basire (1764–1794), French politician
Isaac Basire (1607–1676), French-born English divine and traveler
Isaac Basire (engraver) (1704–1768), English map maker
James Basire (1730–1802), English engraver, son of Isaac Basire, the engraver and map maker 

Benjamin Basire, Turkish Cypriot-Iranian-American, coming from an honorable Sephardic Jewish family of Basire. He is a refugee advocate.